Forensic entomology is the scientific study of the colonization of a dead body by arthropods. This includes the study of insect types commonly associated with cadavers, their respective life cycles, their ecological presences in a given environment, as well as the changes in insect assemblage with the progression of decomposition. Insect succession patterns are identified based on the time a given species of insect spends in a given developmental stage, and how many generations have been produced since the insects introduction to a given food source. Insect development alongside environmental data such as temperature and vapor density, can be used to estimate the time since death, due to the fact that flying insects are attracted to a body immediately after death.  The identification of postmortem interval to aid in death investigations is the primary scope of this scientific field.
However, forensic entomology is not limited to homicides, it has also been used in cases of neglect and abuse, in toxicology contexts to detect the presence of drugs, and in dry shelf food contamination incidents. Equally, insect assemblages present on a body, can be used to approximate a given location, as certain insects may be unique to certain areas. Therefore, forensic entomology can be divided into three subfields: urban, stored-product and medico-legal/medico-criminal entomology.

History
Historically, there have been several accounts of applications for, and experimentation with, forensic entomology. Aside from an initial case report in China from the 13th century, the primitive observation and correlation between arthropods and forensic contexts were documented in Germany and France. This was conducted during a mass exhumation in the late 1880s by Hofmann and Reinhard. However, only in the last 30 years has forensic entomology been systematically explored as a feasible source for evidence in criminal investigations. Through their own experiments and interest in arthropods and death, Sung Tzu, Francesco Redi, Bergeret d’Arbois, Jean Pierre Mégnin and the physiologist Hermann Reinhard have helped to lay the foundations for today's modern forensic entomology.

Song Ci
The Song Dynasty (960–1279) forensic science book Collected Cases of Injustice Rectified published by court judge, physician, medical scientist and writer Song Ci in 1247 contains the oldest known case of forensic entomology. In a murder case of 1235, a villager was stabbed to death and authorities determined that his wounds were inflicted by a sickle; this was a tool used for cutting rice at harvest time, a fact which led them to suspect a fellow peasant worker was involved. The local magistrate had the villagers assemble in the town square where they would temporarily relinquish their sickles. Within minutes, a mass of blow flies gathered around one sickle and none other, attracted to the scent of traces of blood unseen by the naked eye. It became apparent to all that the owner of that sickle was the culprit, the latter pleading for mercy as he was detained by authorities.

Song Ci (sometimes referred to as Sung Tzu) was a judicial intendant who lived in China 1188-1251 AD. In 1247 AD Song Ci wrote a book entitled Washing Away of Wrongs as a handbook for coroners. In this book Song Ci depicts several cases in which he took notes on how a person died and elaborates on probable causes. He explains in detail on how to examine a corpse both before and after burial. He also explains the process of how to determine a probable cause of death. The main purpose of this book was to be used as a guide for other investigators so they could assess the scene of the crime effectively. His level of detail in explaining what he observed in all his cases laid down the fundamentals for modern forensic entomologists and is the first recorded account in history of someone using forensic entomology for judicial means.

Francesco Redi

In 1668, Italian physician Francesco Redi disproved the theory of spontaneous generation. The accepted theory of Redi's day claimed that maggots developed spontaneously from rotting meat. In an experiment, he used samples of rotting meat that were either fully exposed to the air, partially exposed to the air, or not exposed to air at all. Redi showed that both fully and partially exposed rotting meat developed fly maggots, whereas rotting meat that was not exposed to air did not develop maggots. This discovery completely changed the way people viewed the decomposition of organisms and prompted further investigations into insect life cycles and into entomology in general.

Bergeret d'Arbois
Dr. Louis François Etienne Bergeret (1814–1893) was a French hospital physician, and was the first to apply forensic entomology to a case. In a case report published in 1855 he stated a general life cycle for insects and made many assumptions about their mating habits. Nevertheless, these assumptions led him to the first application of forensic entomology in an estimation of post-mortem interval (PMI). His report used forensic entomology as tool to prove his hypothesis on how and when the person had died.

Hermann Reinhard
The first systematic study in forensic entomology was conducted in 1881 by Hermann Reinhard, a German medical doctor who played a vital role in the history of forensic entomology. He exhumed many bodies and demonstrated that the development of many different types of insect species could be tied to buried bodies. Reinhard conducted his first study in east Germany, and collected many Phorid flies from this initial study. He also concluded that the development of only some of the insects living with corpses underground were associated with them, since there were 15-year-old beetles who had little direct contact with them. Reinhard's works and studies were used extensively in further forensic entomology studies.

Jean Pierre Mégnin

French veterinarian and entomologist Jean Pierre Mégnin (1828–1905), published many articles and books on various subjects including the books Faune des Tombeaux and La Faune des Cadavres, which are considered to be among the most important forensic entomology books in history. In his second book he did revolutionary work on the theory of predictable waves, or successions of insects onto corpses. By counting numbers of live and dead mites that developed every 15 days and comparing this with his initial count on the infant, he was able to estimate how long that infant was dead.

In this book, he asserted that exposed corpses were subject to eight successional waves, whereas buried corpses were only subject to two waves. Mégnin made many great discoveries that helped shed new light on many of the general characteristics of decaying flora and fauna. Mégnin's work and study of the larval and adult forms of insect families found in cadavers sparked the interest of future entomologists and encouraged more research in the link between arthropods and the deceased, and thereby helped to establish the scientific discipline of forensic entomology.

Forensic entomology subfields

Urban forensic entomology
Urban forensic entomology typically concerns pests infestations in buildings gardens or that may be the basis of litigation between private parties and service providers such as landlords or exterminators. Urban forensic entomology studies may also indicate the appropriateness of certain pesticide treatments and may also be used in stored products cases where it can help to determine chain of custody, when all points of possible infestation are examined in order to determine who is at fault.

Stored-product forensic entomology

Stored-product forensic entomology is often used in litigation over insect infestation or contamination of commercially distributed foods.

Medico-legal forensic entomology
Medicolegal forensic entomology covers evidence gathered through arthropod studies at the scenes of murder, suicide, rape, physical abuse and contraband trafficking. In murder investigations it deals with which insects eggs appear, their location on the body and in what order they appear. This can be helpful in determining a post mortem interval (PMI) and location of a death in question. Since many insects exhibit a degree of endemism (occurring only in certain places), or have a well-defined phenology (active only at a certain season, or time of day), their presence in association with other evidence can demonstrate potential links to times and locations where other events may have occurred. This discipline also assists in helping associate a victim, suspect and scene together. This is possible due to the different insect species located in specific geographical locations. Another area covered by medicolegal forensic entomology is the relatively new field of entomotoxicology. This particular branch involves the utilization of entomological specimens found at a scene in order to test for different drugs that may have possibly played a role in the death of the victim. The analytical perspective behind these methods essentially relies upon the fact that the presence of drugs within the carcass has an effect on the growth and morphology of the insects subsequently ingesting the toxins from the corpse. However, due to these morphological alterations resulting on the insects in question, this can potentially lead to an erroneous postmortem interval interpretation when basing the PMI estimation on the specimens physical development.

Entomology can also be of aid in medico-legal cases when depicting the site of an injury. This can be said due to the species preference of alimentation. When eggs laid on the corpse by blow flies subsequently hatch into first instar (first stage larvae), they require a liquid protein meal. However, due to their minute size and fragility they are unable to break through the individuals skin themselves to attain this nutrition. Therefore, the female ensures to lay her eggs near a wound site or natural orifice to provide blood, mucosal layer and body fluids that are accessible for an easier feed.

Myiasis 
In cases of abandonment or neglect, the presence of Myiasis may be noted. The latter can be described as blow flies colonizing a human or animal in life. In other words, it is the infestation of living vertebrate animals with dipteran larvae. Essentially, this insect succession will feed on the organisms living tissue, ingested food or liquid body substances. However, it is imperative to be cautious of the confusion myiasis may cause in a forensic context. This said, if the victim or found remains were colonized when alive, prior to being discovered, the entomological evidence would be indicating time of neglect or injury, rather than time of death.

Invertebrate types

Scorpionflies

Scorpionflies (order Mecoptera) were the first insects to arrive at a donated human cadaver observed (by the entomologist Natalie Lindgren) at the Southeast Texas Applied Forensic Science Facility near Huntsville, Texas, and remained on the corpse for one and a half days, outnumbering flies during that period. The presence of scorpionflies thus indicates that a body must be fresh.

Flies

Flies (order Diptera) are often first on the scene. They prefer a moist corpse for their offspring, maggots to feed on. The most significant types of fly include:

Blow flies – Family Calliphoridae- Flies in this family are often metallic in appearance and between 10 and 14 mm in length. In addition to the name blow-fly, some members of this family are known as blue bottle fly, cluster flies, greenbottles, or black blowfly. A characteristic of the blow-fly is its 3-segmented antennae. Hatching from an egg to the first larval stage takes from eight hours to one day. Larvae have three stages of development (called instars); each stage is separated by a molting event. Molting can be defined as the process of new cubicle production while subsequently shedding the old cuticle. Larvae's ideal habitat in regard to pupation are locations providing access to loose, damp soil and litter. The latter consists of temperate and rather tropical areas. Worldwide, there are 1100 known species of blowflies, with 228 species in the Neotropics, and a large number of species in Africa and Southern Europe. The most common area to find Calliphoridae species are in the countries of India, Japan, Central America, and in the southern United States. Some prominent species of Calliphoridae are Calliphora vomitoria and Calliphora vicina.

Flesh flies – Family Sarcophagidae- Most flesh flies breed in carrion, dung, garbage, or decaying material, but a few species lay their eggs in the open wounds of mammals; hence their common name. Characteristics of the flesh-fly is its 3-segmented antennae. Most holarctic Sarcophagidae vary in size from 4 to 18 mm in length (Tropical species can be larger) with black and gray longitudinal stripes on the thorax and checkering on the abdomen. Flesh-flies, being viviparous, frequently give birth to live young on corpses of human and other animals, at any stage of decomposition, from newly dead through to bloated or decaying (though the latter is more common). Sarcophaga barbata are specifically useful since they deposit maggots directly onto the decomposing body, their larger, visible size, and difference in activity during different stages. Their main limitation, however, is due to lack of information surrounding their geographic distribution and taxonomic features.

House fly – Family Muscidae- is the most common of all flies found in homes, and indeed one of the most widely distributed insects; it is often considered a pest that can carry serious diseases. The adults are 6–9 mm long. Their thorax is gray, with four longitudinal dark lines on the back. The underside of their abdomen is yellow, and their whole body is covered with hair. Each female fly can lay up to 500 eggs in several batches of about 75 to 150 eggs. Genus Hydrotaea are of particular forensic importance.
Cheese flies – Family Piophilidae - Most are scavengers in animal products and fungi. The best-known member of the family is Piophila casei. It is a small fly, about four mm (1/6 inch) long, found worldwide. This fly's larva infests cured meats, smoked fish, cheeses, and decaying animals and is sometimes called the cheese skipper for its leaping ability. Forensic entomology uses the presence of Piophila casei larvae to help estimate the date of death for human remains. They do not take up residence in a corpse until three to six months after death. The adult fly's body is black, blue-black, or bronze, with some yellow on the head, antennae, and legs. The wings are faintly iridescent and lie flat upon the fly's abdomen when at rest. At four mm (1/6 inch) long, the fly is one-third to one-half as long as the common housefly.
Coffin flies – Phoridae – a/k/a Humpbacked flies - Larvae feed on decaying bodies. Some species can burrow to a depth of 50 cm over 4 days. Important in buried bodies.
Lesser corpse flies – Sphaeroceridae
Lesser house flies – Fanniidae
Black scavenger flies – Sepsidae
Sun flies - Heleomyzidae
Black soldier fly - Stratiomyidae - have potential for use in forensic entomology. The larvae are common scavengers in compost heaps, are found in association with carrion, can be destructive pests in honey bee hives, and are used in manure management (for both house fly control and reduction in manure volume). The larvae range in size from 1/8 to 3/4 of an inch (3 to 19 millimeters). The adult fly is a mimic, very close in size, color, and appearance to the organ pipe mud dauber wasp and its relatives.
Non-biting midges - Chironomidae - these flies have a complex life cycle. While adults are terrestrial and phytophagous, larvae are aquatic and detritivorous. Immature instars have been used as forensic markers in several cases where submerged corpses were found.

Beetles

Beetles (Order Coleoptera) are generally found on the corpse when it is more decomposed. In drier conditions, the beetles can be replaced by moth flies (Psychodidae).

Rove beetles – family Staphylinidae – are elongate beetles with small elytra (wing covers) and large jaws. Rove beetles have a four-stage life cycle; egg, larvae, pupa and adult. Creophilus species are common predators of carrion, and since they are large, are a very visible component of the fauna of corpses. Some adult Staphylinidae are early visitors to a corpse, feeding on larvae of all species of fly, including the later predatory fly larvae. They lay their eggs in the corpse, and the emerging larvae are also predators. Some species have a long development time in the egg, and are common only during the later stages of decomposition. Staphylinids can also tear open the pupal cases of flies, to sustain themselves at a corpse for long periods.
Hister beetles – family Histeridae. Adult histerids are usually shiny beetles (black or metallic-green) which have an introverted head. The carrion-feeding species only become active at night when they enter the maggot-infested part of the corpse to capture and devour their maggot prey. During daylight they hide under the corpse unless it is sufficiently decayed to enable them to hide inside it. They have fast larval development with only two larval stages. Among the first beetles to arrive at a corpse are Histeridae of the genus Saprinus. Saprinus adults feed on both the larvae and pupae of blowflies, although some have a preference for fresh pupae. The adults lay their eggs in the corpse, inhabiting it in the later stages of decay.
Carrion beetles – family Silphidae- Adult Silphidae have an average size of about 12 mm. They are also referred to as burying beetles because they dig and bury small carcasses underground. Both parents tend to their young and exhibit communal breeding. The male carrion beetle's job in care is to provide protection for the breed and carcass from competitors.
Ham beetles – family Cleridae
Carcass beetles – family Trogidae
 Skin/hide beetles – family Dermestidae. Hide beetles are important in the final stages of decomposition of a carcass. The adults and larvae feed on the dried skin, tendons and bone left by fly larvae. Hide beetles are the only beetle with the enzymes necessary for breaking down keratin, a protein component of hair.
Scarab beetles – family Scarabaeidae- Scarab beetles may be any one of around 30,000 beetle species worldwide that are compact, heavy-bodied and oval in shape. The flattened plates, which each antenna terminates, are fitted together to form a club. The outer edges of the front legs may also be toothed or scalloped. These species are known for being one of the heaviest insect species.
Sap beetles – family Nitidulidae

Mites

Many mites (class Acari, not insects) feed on corpses with Macrocheles mites common in the early stages of decomposition, while Tyroglyphidae and Oribatidae mites such as Rostrozetes feed on dry skin in the later stages of decomposition.

Nicrophorus beetles often carry on their bodies the mite Poecilochirus which feed on fly eggs. If they arrive at the corpse before any fly eggs hatch into maggots, the first eggs are eaten and maggot development is delayed. This may lead to incorrect PMI estimates. Nicrophorus beetles find the ammonia excretions of blowfly maggots toxic, and the Poecilochirus mites, by keeping the maggot population low, allow Nicrophorus to occupy the corpse.

Moths

Moths (order Lepidoptera) specifically clothes-moths – Family Tineidae – are closely related to butterflies. Most species of moth are nocturnal, but there are crepuscular and diurnal species. During their larval stages, clothes moths tend to feed on mammalian hair. They are amongst the final animals contributing to the decomposition of a corpse. This said, adult moths lay their legs on a carcass subsequently to fly larvae having had their presence on it.

Wasps, ants, and bees

Wasps, ants, and bees (order Hymenoptera) are not necessarily necrophagous. While some feed on the body, some are also predatory, and eat the insects feeding on the body. Thus meaning they are parasitoids (Parasitoid wasp). These Hymenoptera lay their eggs within the eggs or pupae of other insects; essentially causing the death of host insects. Wasps can also be of association to the family Pteromalidae. The latter can lay single or multiple eggs. They oviposit in pupae of muscoid flies (blow flies). Subsequently, to the wasp eggs hatching, larvae will feed on the fly developing within the puparium; leading to its death. Bees and wasps have been seen feeding on the body during the early stages. This may cause problems for murder cases in which larval flies are used to estimate the post mortem interval since eggs and larvae on the body may have been consumed prior to the arrival on scene of investigators.

Factors

Moisture levels

Rain and humidity levels in the area where the body is found can affect the time for insect development. In most species, large amounts of rain will indirectly cause slower development due to drop in temperature. Light rain or a very humid environment, by acting as an insulator, will permit a greater core temperature within the maggot mass, resulting in faster development.

Submerged corpses
M. Lee Goff, a noted and well respected forensic entomologist, was assigned to a case involving the discovery of a decomposing body found on a boat half a mile from shore. Upon collection of the maggot mass, only one insect, Chrysomya megacephala, was discovered. He concluded that the water barrier accounted for the scarcity of other flies. He also noted that flies will not attempt to trek across large bodies of water unless there is a substantially influential attractant.

In addition, the amount of time a maggot mass has been exposed to salt water can affect its development. From the cases Goff observed he found that if subjected for more than 30 minutes, there was a 24‑hour developmental delay. Not many more studies have been conducted and thus a specific amount of delay time is difficult to estimate.

The main focus of a study accomplished by Payne and King  using fetal pigs, was the insect succession regarding carcass decomposition in an aquatic setting. Their results concluded that in the early floating stages of the cadaver, eggs were laid by blowflies. Moreover, by the bloating stage, most of the exposed flesh was absent and maggots migrated from the body. Many of the latter were present below the water line and fed on the carcass; with only their Spiracle (arthropods) protruding the surface.

Sun exposure
"Because insects are cold-blooded animals, their rate of development is more or less dependent on ambient temperature."
Bodies exposed to large amounts of sunlight will heat up, giving the insects a warmer area to develop, reducing their development time.
An experiment conducted by Bernard Greenberg and John Charles Kunich with the use of rabbit carcasses to study accumulation of degree days found that with temperature ranging in the mid 70s to high 80s the amount of developmental time for maggots was significantly reduced.

In contrast, bodies found in shaded areas will be cooler, and insects will require longer growth periods. In addition, if temperatures reach extreme levels of cold, insects instinctively know to prolong their development time in order to hatch into a more accepting and viable climate in order to increase the chance of survival and reproduction.

Air exposure
Hanged bodies can be expected to show their own quantity and variety of flies. Also, the amount of time flies will stay on a hanged body will vary in comparison to one found on the ground. A hanged body is more exposed to air and thus will dry out faster, leaving less food source for the maggots.

As the body begins to decompose, a compilation of fluids will leak to the ground. This area is where most of the expected fauna can be found. Also, it is more likely that rove beetles and other non-flying insects will be found here instead of directly on the body. Fly maggots, initially deposited on the body, may also be found below.

Geography
According to Jean Pierre Mégnin's book La Faune des Cadavres there are eight distinct faunal successions attracted to a corpse. While most beetles and flies of forensic importance can be found worldwide, a portion of them are limited to a specific range of habitats. It is forensically important to know the geographical distribution of these insects is order to determine information such as post mortem interval or whether a body has been moved from its original place of death.

Calliphoridae is arguably the most important family concerning forensic entomology given that they are the first to arrive on the corpse. The family can be found worldwide. Chrysomya rufifaces, the hairy maggot blow fly, is a forensically important member of the family Calliphoridae and is widespread, however it is not prevalent in the Southern California, Arizona, New Mexico, Louisiana, Florida, or Illinois regions.

Flesh flies fall under the family Sacrophagidae and generally arrive at a corpse following Calliphoridae. Unlike Calliphoridae, however, members of this family are able to fly in heavy rain. This key advantage enables them to occasionally reach a body before Calliphoridae, affecting the maggot mass that will be discovered. Flesh flies are globally distributed including habitats in the United States, Europe, Asia, and the Middle East.

Beetles are representative of the order Coleoptera which accounts for the largest of the insect orders. Beetles are very adaptive and can be found in almost all environments with the exception of Antarctica and high mountainous regions. The most diverse beetle fauna can be found in the tropics. In addition, beetles are less submissive to temperatures. Thus, if a carcass has been found in cold temperatures, the beetle will be prevalent over Calliphoridae.

Weather
Various weather conditions in a given amount of time cause certain pests to invade human households. This is because the insects are in search of food, water, and shelter.
Damp weather causes reproduction and growth enhancement in many insect types, especially when coupled with warm temperatures. Most pests concerned at this time are ants, spiders, crickets, cockroaches, ladybugs, yellowjackets, hornets, mice, and rats.
When conditions are dry, the deprivation of moisture outside drives many pests inside searching for water. While the rainy weather increases the numbers of insects, this dry weather causes pest invasions to increase. The pests most commonly known during dry conditions are scorpions, ants, pillbugs, millipedes, crickets, and spiders. Extreme drought does kill many populations of insects, but also drives surviving insects to invade more often.
Cold temperatures outside will cause invasions beginning in the late summer months and early fall. Box elder bugs, cluster flies, ladybugs, and silverfish are noticed some of the most common insects to seek the warm indoors. In general, insects are poikilothermic animals; thus meaning their level of activity is substantially depended upon their surrounding environmental conditions. An increase in the temperature will result in an accelerated metabolism of the insect; hence resulting in an increased activity.

Modern techniques
Many new techniques have been developed and are used in order to more accurately gather evidence, or reevaluate old information. The use of these newly developed techniques and evaluations have become relevant in litigation and appeals. Forensic entomology not only uses arthropod biology, but it pulls from other sciences, introducing fields like chemistry and genetics, exploiting their inherent synergy through the use of DNA in forensic entomology.

Scanning electron microscopy
Fly larvae and fly eggs are used to aid in the determination of a PMI. In order for the data to be useful the larvae and eggs must be identified down to a species level to get an accurate estimate for the PMI. There are many techniques currently being developed to differentiate between the various species of forensically important insects. A study in 2007 demonstrates a technique that can use scanning electron microscopy (SEM) to identify key morphological features of eggs and maggots. Some of the morphological differences that can help identify the different species are the presence/absence of anastomosis, the presence/absence of anterior and posterior spiracles, the cephalopharyngeal skeleton as well as the shape and length of the median area.

The SEM method provides an array of morphological features for use in identifying fly eggs; however, this method does have some disadvantages. The main disadvantage is that it requires expensive equipment and can take time to identify the species from which the egg originated, so it may not be useful in a field study or to quickly identify a particular egg.
The SEM method is effective provided there is ample time and the proper equipment and the particular fly eggs are plentiful. The ability to use these morphological differences gives forensic entomologists a powerful tool that can help with estimating a post mortem interval, along with other relevant information, such as whether the body has been disturbed post mortem.

Potassium permanganate staining
When scanning electron microscopy is not available, a faster, lower cost technique is potassium permanganate staining. The collected eggs are rinsed with a normal saline solution and placed in a glass petri dish. The eggs are soaked in a 1% potassium permanganate solution for one minute and then dehydrated and mounted onto a slide for observation. These slides can be used with any light microscope with a calibrated eyepiece to compare various morphological features. The most important and useful features for identifying eggs are the size, length, and width of the plastron, as well as the morphology of the plastron in the area around the micropyle. The various measurements and observations when compared to standards for forensically important species are used to determine the species of the egg.

Mitochondrial DNA
In 2001, a method was devised by Jeffrey Wells and Felix Sperling to use mitochondrial DNA to differentiate between different species of the subfamily Chrysomyinae. This is particularly useful when working to determine the identity of specimens that do not have distinctive morphological characteristics at certain life stages.

Mock crime scenes
A valuable tool that is becoming very common in the training of forensic entomologists is the use of mock crime scenes using pig carcasses. The pig carcass represents a human body and can be used to illustrate various environmental effects on both arthropod succession and the estimate of the post mortem interval. Pigs are the most frequently utilised model in an attempt to gather data regarding forensic experimental analysis. The latter is highly proportionate to human nature due to our overlapping characteristics with the mentioned species. These interrelated components include: subcutaneous fat stores, skin thickness, range of adult body mass, hair covering, and omnivorous diets.

Gene expression studies
Although physical characteristics and sizes at various instars have been used to estimate fly age, a more recent study has been conducted to determine the age of an egg based on the expression of particular genes. This is particularly useful in determining developmental stages that are not evidenced by change in size; such as the egg or pupa and where only a general time interval can be estimated based on the duration of the particular developmental stage. This is done by breaking the stages down into smaller units separated by predictable changed in gene expression. Three genes were measured in an experiment with Drosophila melanogaster: bicoid (bcd), slalom (sll), and chitin synthase (cs). These three genes were used because they are likely to be in varied levels during different times of the egg development process. These genes all share a linear relationship in regards to age of the egg; that is, the older the egg is the more of the particular gene is expressed. However, all of the genes are expressed in varying amounts. Different genes on different loci would need to be selected for another fly species. The genes expressions are mapped in a control sample to formulate a developmental chart of the gene expression at certain time intervals. This chart can then be compared to the measured values of gene expression to accurately predict the age of an egg to within two hours with a high confidence level. Even though this technique can be used to estimate the age of an egg, the feasibility and legal acceptance of this must be considered for it to be a widely utilized forensic technique. One benefit of this would be that it is like other DNA-based techniques so most labs would be equipped to conduct similar experiments without requiring new capital investment. This style of age determination is in the process of being used to more accurately find the age of the instars and pupa; however, it is much more complicated, as there are more genes being expressed during these stages. The hope is that with this and other similar techniques a more accurate PMI can be obtained.

Insect activity case study
A preliminary investigation of insect colonization and succession on remains in New Zealand revealed the following results on decay and insect colonization.

Open field habitat
The average rainfall for the first 3 weeks in this environment was 3.0 mm/day. Around days 17–45, the body began to start active decay. During this stage, the insect successions started with Calliphora stygia, which lasted until day 27. The larvae of Chrysomya rufifacies were present between the day 13 and day 47. Hydrotaea rostrata, larvae of Lucilia sericata, family Psychodidae, and Sylvicola were found to be present relatively late in the body's decay.

Coastal sand-dune habitat
The daily average rainfall was recorded as 1.4 mm/day for the first 3 weeks. The post-decay time interval, beginning at day six after death and ending around day 15 after death, is greatly reduced from the average post-decay time, due to the high average temperature of this environment. Insects obtained late in the post-active stage include the Calliphora quadrimaculata, adult Sphaeroceridae, Psychodidae and Piophilidae (no larvae from this last family were obtained in recovery).

Native bush habitat
The average rainfall in this habitat was recorded at 0.4 mm/day. After the bloat stage, which lasted until day seven after death, post-active decay began around day 14. In this habitat, the H. rostrata, adult Phoridae, Sylvicola larvae and adult were the predominant species remaining on the body during the pre-skeletonization stages.

In literature
Throughout its history the study of forensic entomology has not remained an esoteric science reserved only for entomologists and forensic scientists.
Early twentieth-century popular scientific literature began to pique a broader interest in entomology. The very popular ten-volume book series, Alfred Brehem's Thierleben (Life of Animals, 1876–1879) expounded on many zoological topics, including arthropods. The accessible writing style of French entomologist Jean-Henri Fabre was also instrumental in the popularization of entomology. His collection of writings Souvenirs Entomologique, written during the last half of the 19th century, is especially useful because of the meticulous attention to detail to the observed insects' behaviors and life cycles.

The real impetus behind the modern cultural fascination with solving crime using entomological evidence can be traced back to the works Faune des Tombeaux (Fauna of the Tombs, 1887) and Les Faunes des Cadavres (Fauna of Corpses, 1894) by French veterinarian and entomologist Jean Pierre Mégnin. These works made the concept of the process of insect ecological succession on a corpse understandable and interesting to an ordinary reader in a way that no other previous scientific work had done. It was after the publication of Mégnin's work that the studies of forensic science and entomology became an established part of Western popular culture, which in turn inspired other scientists to continue and expand upon his research.

See also
Forensic entomology and the law
Insect indicators of abuse or neglect

Notes

Further reading

 Spiralbound also aimed at professional entomologists, but shorter and with a popular style.

Gennard, Dorothy E., 2007 Forensic entomology : an introduction   assumes no prior knowledge

 A technical hardback designed for professional entomologists.

External links

www.forensic-entomology.com by Dr. Jason H. Byrd
European Association for Forensic Entomology homepage
Collection of original articles about Forensic Entomology. Many downloadable illustrated pdf's of cases, including neglect cases.
Institute of Forensic Entomology Vienna Click on the pictures for enlargements and graphs
What happens to the body after death
Pastoral putrefaction down on the Body Farm: Autopsy, HBO Documentaries 
Dating Death Great Moments of Science
DNA techniques for forensic entomology
pdf about forensic entomology Deon Canyon
Forensic Entomology page from Australia (Ian Dadour)
Visible Proofs
Medical Zoology Pages
Survey on carrion-visiting beetles – Research into the fauna of carrion-visiting beetles in Erlangen, Bavaria (2006): Carrion is an ecosystem of its own. Diverse species of beetles – belonging to different guilds – arrive and depart from carrion at different times – succession occurs. The arrival time and growth rates of beetles inhabiting corpses depending on weather, location and type of carrion have been studied.
History of Forensic Entomology (many illustrations)
Diagnosis and Keys to South American Coleoptera of Forensic Importance
Forensic entomology - use of insects to help solve crime
A Forensic Entomology Case from the Amazon Rain Forest of Brazil
Run models and calculate degree-days
Growing Degree Days
Grounds Maintenance magazine 
Medical History Annick Opinel 2008, The Emergence of French Medical Entomology: The Influence of Universities, the Institut Pasteur and Military Physicians (1890–c.1938) Med Hist. 2008 July; 52(3): 387–405.

 
Chinese inventions
French inventions
German inventions
Italian inventions
Subfields of entomology